Cass-Clay or Cass-Clay Creamery is a creamery headquartered in Fargo, North Dakota. It was founded in 1934 in neighboring Moorhead, Minnesota. Its present-day headquarters are at 200 20th St North in Fargo. It manufactures dairy products such as milk, cream, butter, sour cream, cottage cheese, yogurt and ice cream. It also manufactured dips and juices.

History
In 1935 Cass-Clay Cooperative Creamery opened its first plant in Moorhead Minnesota

In 2007 it was acquired by Associated Milk Producers Inc. and in 2012 it was purchased by Kemps LLC

References

External links
Cass-Clay Creamery website

Drink companies of the United States
Companies based in Fargo–Moorhead
Dairy products companies of the United States
Food and drink companies based in North Dakota
Manufacturing companies based in North Dakota